IRIX is a discontinued operating system developed by Silicon Graphics (SGI) to run on the company's proprietary MIPS workstations and servers. It is based on UNIX System V with BSD extensions. In IRIX, SGI originated the XFS file system and the industry-standard OpenGL graphics system.

History
SGI originated the IRIX name in the 1988 release 3.0 of the operating system for the SGI IRIS 4D series of workstations and servers. Previous releases are identified only by the release number prefixed by "4D1-", such as "4D1-2.2". The "4D1-" prefix continued to be used in official documentation to prefix IRIX release numbers. Prior to the IRIS 4D, SGI bundled the GL2 operating system, based on UniSoft UniPlus System V Unix, and using the proprietary MEX (Multiple EXposure) windowing system.

IRIX 3.x is based on UNIX System V Release 3 with 4.3BSD enhancements, and incorporates the 4Sight windowing system, based on NeWS and IRIS GL. SGI's own Extent File System (EFS) replaces the System V filesystem.

IRIX 4.0, released in 1991, replaces 4Sight with the X Window System (X11R4), the 4Dwm window manager providing a similar look and feel to 4Sight.

IRIX 5.0, released in 1993, incorporates certain features of UNIX System V Release 4, including ELF executables. IRIX 5.3 introduced the XFS journaling file system.

In 1994, IRIX 6.0 added support for the 64-bit MIPS R8000 processor, but is otherwise similar to IRIX 5.2. Later 6.x releases support other members of the MIPS processor family in 64-bit mode. IRIX 6.3 was released for the SGI O2 workstation only. IRIX 6.4 improved multiprocessor scalability for the Octane, Origin 2000, and Onyx2 systems. The Origin 2000 and Onyx2 IRIX 6.4 was marketed as "Cellular IRIX", although it only incorporates some features from the original Cellular IRIX distributed operating system project.

The last major version of IRIX is 6.5, released in May 1998. New minor versions of IRIX 6.5 were released every quarter until 2005, and then four minor releases. Through version 6.5.22, there are two branches of each release: a maintenance release (identified by an "m" suffix) that includes only fixes to the original IRIX 6.5 code, and a feature release (with an "f" suffix) that includes improvements and enhancements. An overlay upgrade from 6.5.x to the 6.5.22 maintenance release was available as a free download, whereas versions 6.5.23 and higher required an active Silicon Graphics support contract.

A 2001 Computerworld review found IRIX in a "critical" state. SGI had been moving its efforts to Linux and the Windows-based SGI Visual Workstation but MIPS and IRIX customers convinced SGI to continue to support its platform through 2006. On September 6, 2006, an SGI press release announced the end of the MIPS and IRIX product lines. Production ended on December 29, 2006, with final deliveries in March 2007, except by special arrangement. Support for these products ended in December 2013 and they will receive no further updates.

Much of IRIX's core technology has been open sourced and ported by SGI to Linux, including XFS.

In 2009, SGI filed bankruptcy and then was purchased by Rackable Systems, which was later purchased by Hewlett Packard Enterprise in 2016. All SGI hardware produced after 2007 is based on either IA-64 or x86-64 architecture, so it is incapable of running IRIX and is instead intended for Red Hat Enterprise Linux or SUSE Linux Enterprise Server. HPE has not stated any plans for IRIX development or source code release.

Features
IRIX 6.5 is compliant with UNIX System V Release 4, UNIX 95, and POSIX (including 1e/2c draft 15 ACLs and Capabilities).

In the early 1990s, IRIX was a leader in Symmetric Multi-Processing (SMP), scalable from 1 to more than 1024 processors with a single system image. IRIX has strong support for real-time disk and graphics I/O. IRIX was widely used for the 1990s and 2000s, in the computer animation and scientific visualization industries due to its large application base and high performance. It still is relevant in a few legacy applications.

IRIX is one of the first Unix versions to feature a graphical user interface for the main desktop environment. IRIX Interactive Desktop uses the 4Dwm X window manager with a custom look designed using the Motif widget toolkit. IRIX is the originator of the industry standard OpenGL for graphics chips and Image processing libraries.

IRIX uses the MIPSPro Compiler for both its front end and back end. The compiler, also known in earlier versions as IDO (IRIS Development Option) was released in many versions, many of which are coupled to the OS version. The last version was 7.4.4m, designed for 6.5.19 or later.  The compiler is designed to support parallel POSIX programming in C/C++, Fortran 77/90, and Ada. The Workshop GUI IDE is used for development.  Other tools include Speedshop for performance tuning, and Performance Co-Pilot.

See also
 Cray
 IRIX software
 Silicon Graphics Image format about .iris
 SGI Indy

References

External links
 Technical Publications Mirror
 Silicon Bunny - IRIX software and information
 IRIX Network - IRIX software, information, forums, and archive
 IRIX Admin: Backup, Security, and Accounting Document Number: 007-2862-004 February 1999
 Silicon Graphics User Group

Silicon Graphics
1988 software
 
Discontinued operating systems
MIPS operating systems
UNIX System V